The Canadian Soccer League was a Division 1 professional soccer league that operated for six seasons between 1987 and 1992. It was a nationwide league that had teams in six provinces over the course of its history. It was the last top-division league in Canada until the Canadian Premier League began play in 2019.

History

Early Canadian professional soccer
Professional soccer existed in multiple form in Canada in the decades prior to the formation of the CSL. In 1926, the National Soccer League was formed in Canada, which evolved into the modern edition of the Canadian Soccer League, but was more of a semi-professional nature. From 1960 to 1961, the Eastern Canada Professional Soccer League (ECPSL) operated in the country, at times attracting crowds of around 10,000 spectators. From 1968 to 1984, the US-based North American Soccer League (NASL), a top division professional league, contained two Canadian teams at its inception (the Toronto Falcons and Vancouver Royals), rising to five Canadian teams at the time of its folding - the Calgary Boomers, Edmonton Drillers, Montréal Manic, Vancouver Whitecaps and Toronto Blizzard. In 1983, a fully professional Canadian-only league, the Canadian Professional Soccer League was formed, but it failed to last a full season before disbanding.

Formation of the CSL
Following the folding of the NASL, the Canadian Soccer Association created the Canadian Soccer League (CSL). It was the CSA's second attempt at a national professional league, following the failed CPSL in 1983.
The CSL was formed in the aftermath of Canada's participation in the 1986 World Cup finals tournament held in Mexico, for which Canada was an oddity as a country whose association was able to qualify a team despite not having a domestic professional league, or even a domestically based professional team with the demise in 1984 of the U.S.-based North American Soccer League.  Founding league commissioner Dale Barnes voiced sentiment aptly when he said the league is to "bring our players home." In its first season the league had 138 Canadian players across its eight teams and most of the players from  Canada’s 1986 World Cup squad joined the league. Learning from the CPSL failure, the organizers attempted to lay the foundation more successfully, with several teams coming from existing franchises in the provincial leagues, including a team salary limit of $300,000 for players.

Inaugural season
In the league's inaugural season, eight teams were divided into two divisions. The East Division consisted of National Capital Pioneers, Hamilton Steelers, Toronto Blizzard, and the North York Rockets. The West Division comprised the Calgary Kickers, Edmonton Brick Men, Vancouver 86ers, and the Winnipeg Fury. The league's inaugural match took place on June 7, 1987 in Aylmer, Quebec between the National Capital Pioneers and the Hamilton Steelers and finished in a 1–1 draw, in a steady drizzle, in front 2,500 spectators. That season, Hamilton won their division both in the regular season and in the playoffs, as did Calgary. The final saw the top point-getting team in the regular season, Calgary, defeat the second-best side, Hamilton, 2–1 at home in a winner take all one game final.

Continuation
The league gained a leap in credibility when an agreement was reached with TSN to broadcast a CSL Game of the Week, allowing a nationwide audience to view a game on domestic cable TV each Sunday evening.  Broadcasts featured play-by-play commentator Vic Rauter and analyst Graham Leggat. The league received sponsorship from companies such as Gatorade, Gillette, Chrysler, Molson, and Umbro, among others. Also the league adopted the standard FIFA points system (2–1–0, then 3–1–0) as well as allowing for draws instead of 'Americanizing' the points system with bonus points and two different categories for both wins and losses unlike the NASL or the APSL which was to follow.

Over the course of the league's six seasons, various teams joined the league including Montreal Supra, Victoria Vistas, London Lasers, Kitchener Spirit, and the Nova Scotia Clippers. Financial instability was common with many teams folding during the years. Only four clubs - Vancouver, North York, Toronto, and Winnipeg - participated in all six seasons. In early 1991, league commissioner Dale Barnes retired before the start of the 1991 season, with Hamilton Steelers owner Mario DiBartolomeo becoming the interim league president. The next year, Montreal Supra owner Frank Aliaga being named the new league president. 

The Vancouver 86ers became the dominant team in the league, winning the four consecutive league titles from 1988 to 1991. In 1992, the Winnipeg Fury ended Vancouver's run, winning the final MITA Cup, before the league folded.

Downfall and league folding
The league and it's franchises struggled with financial issues throughout its tenure. After the 1991 season, four franchises folded, which was the start of the end of the league. The financial picture did not improve during the season, and with dysfunction about the most sustainable path for professional soccer, concerns about club stability – declining attendance and red ink continuing to mount in most markets, the resignation of Canadian soccer advocates such as Mario DiBartolomeo, Frank Aliaga, and Karsten von Wersebe. Vancouver media reported that the Vancouver 86ers' owner was the only team to fully pay league dues during the final season and had injected $65,000 for the London Lasers to finish the season, and paid playoff travel and accommodation expenses for the Toronto Blizzard.

On October 6, 1992, the day of the CSL final, it was announced that Vancouver joined the APSL, a league trying to show the USSF it had the wherewithal, new higher standards for 1993 (financial capitalization, salary budget, $1 million operating budget, front office, coaching, market size etc.), to be chosen as the Division 1 league by the USSF. Vancouver cited financial stability and higher growth prospects with the league expected by some to become the USSF's Division 1 league as required by FIFA when awarded the United States the 1994 World Cup.

Even with the Vancouver defection to the United States, the CSL planned to have seven clubs for the 1993 season as of mid-December 1992 including a Burnaby, B.C.-based team; however, opposition from the Vancouver 86ers stymied this ownership's efforts. However, the Toronto Blizzard and Montreal Supra had also planned to join the APSL, although it was not able to meet the financial requirements for the league and instead a new club, Montreal Impact formed and joined the APSL. Meanwhile, Winnipeg and North York joined the Canadian National Soccer League.

When the dust cleared, there were not six Canadian professional teams, the minimum for a league, that survived in any form for the 1993 season, and the league officially folded, bringing an end to the first truly national Canadian league to finish a season. This was a major blow for the Canadian Soccer Association and Canadian soccer, as the CSL had been enormously successful in providing Canadian players with a higher level of competition than had been available at any other time than the North American Soccer League years.  As of 2014, after the 1986 World Cup, players from the CSL cohort have still progressed the furthest in World Cup Qualifying and formed the veteran core of the 2000 CONCACAF Gold Cup winning squad.

Aftermath
Following the demise of the CSL, Canadian professional teams such as the Montreal Impact, Vancouver Whitecaps, and Toronto Lynx continued to play in US-based professional leagues, with later teams such as Toronto FC and Ottawa Fury FC forming as well. In 2019, a new Canadian professional league, the Canadian Premier League was launched, serving as the country's first national professional league since the end of the CSL.

Teams
The Canadian Soccer League showcased 13 teams throughout its six-year history, debuting in 1987 with 8 clubs. The league reached its peak of club participation and national exposure in the 1990 season with 11 clubs, while closing out its final season in 1992 with a low of 6 clubs. Some clubs involved in the league, such as the Vancouver 86ers and Toronto Blizzard, existed prior to the formation of the CSL and would go on to play in other leagues after the CSL's demise in following the 1992 season. Clubs participating in the CSL throughout its six years of existence included:

Timeline

Season summary

Notable players
Twenty-six players from the Canadian Soccer League have since been inducted in the Canada Soccer Hall of Fame. From that group, 11 honoured members made their professional debuts in the Canadian Soccer League.

See also
Canadian Professional Soccer League, a Canadian D1 league that existed in 1983
Canadian Premier League, the current Canadian D1 league that began play in 2019
Canadian Soccer League, an unsanctioned semi-professional soccer league of the same name but unrelated to this league

References

External links
Canadian pro soccer in jeopardy – CBC Archives
All-Time CSL Standings and Statistics
All-Time CSL Player and Goaltender Regular Season Stats
All-Time CSL Player and Goaltender Playoff Stats

 
Defunct soccer leagues in Canada
Defunct top level association football leagues in North America